David Sean Whiteside (born April 19, 1971) is a former Major League Baseball pitcher who played for one season. He pitched for the Detroit Tigers in two games during the 1995 Detroit Tigers season.

External links

1971 births
Living people
Major League Baseball pitchers
Baseball players from Florida
Detroit Tigers players
Niagara Falls Rapids players
Fayetteville Generals players
Lakeland Tigers players
Trenton Thunder players
Jacksonville Suns players
Memphis Chicks players